A Walk in the Fog (Persian: Parse dar meh) is a 2010 film by the Iranian director Bahram Tavakoli. Tavakoli also wrote the script for the film, which was lensed by Hamid Khozouie Abyane. Leila Hatami and Shahab Hosseini starred in the principal roles.

Tavakoli won a Crystal Simorgh for Best First Film at the Fajr Film Festival.

References

Iranian drama films
2010 films